Astrid Hjertenæs Andersen (5 September 1915 – 21 April 1985) was a Norwegian poet and travel-writer. She is a recipient of the Norwegian Critics Prize for Literature (Kritikerprisen), Riksmål Society Literature Prize (Riksmålsprisen), Dobloug Prize (Doblougprisen), and the  Norwegian Academy Prize in memory of Thorleif Dahl (Det Norske Akademi for Språk og Litteratur).

Biography
Astrid Gerd Judith Hjertenæs was born in  Horten (now Borre) in Vestfold County, Norway.  Her father was a naval officer assigned to Karljohansvern.
She attended a secretary and journalist school for women (Hallings sekretær- og journalistskole for damer). She later worked as a typist and journalist for   Aftenposten, Norway's largest newspaper. In 1939, she married the painter Snorre Andersen (1914–1979), who later illustrated several of her poetry collections.
Her work contained nature poems written to her husband's watercolors.

Dating from 1942, she devoted herself entirely writing. Her poems appeared often in both  Aftenposten and Dagbladet. From the 1950s, Andersen wrote  in the modernist direction of Norwegian post-war poetry.  She had studied American poetry and drama during a one-year scholarship at Yale University. The poems show a clear connection to the symbolism of the past century and were often inspired by music and visual art. A strong personal artistic style, often with the use of free forms, together with the suggestive use of images and symbols, characterize her writings.

Awards
Astrid  Andersen was awarded the Norwegian Critics Prize for Literature (Kritikerprisen)  in 1964, Riksmål Society Literature Prize (Riksmålsprisen) in 1976 and Dobloug Prize (Doblougprisen)  in 1984. Additionally in 1984, she received the  Norwegian Academy Prize in memory of Thorleif Dahl (Det Norske Akademi for Språk og Litteratur).

Partial bibliography 
De ville traner – poems (1945)
De unge søylene – poems (1948)
Skilpaddehagen – poems (1950)
Strandens kvinner – poems (1955)
Vandrersken – poems (1957)
Pastoraler – poems (1960)
Frokost i det grønne – poems (1964)
Dr. Gnomen – poems (1967)
Hyrdefløyten – epistler fra Algerie – travel writing 1968)
Rosenbusken – poems (1972)
Svaner og nåtid – epistler fra Island – travel writing (1973)
Et våroffer – poems (1976)
De tyve landskaper – poems (1980)
Samlede dikt – poems (1985)

References

1915 births
1985 deaths
People from Horten
Norwegian women poets
Norwegian travel writers
Women travel writers
Norwegian women non-fiction writers 
20th-century Norwegian women writers
20th-century Norwegian poets
Norwegian Critics Prize for Literature winners
Dobloug Prize winners